Kihansia is a genus of parasitic plants in the Triuridaceae, lacking chlorophyll and obtaining nutrients from fungi in the soil. It contains only one known species, Kihansia lovettii, endemic to the Ulanga District of Tanzania.

References

Triuridaceae
Endemic flora of Tanzania
Parasitic plants
Monotypic Pandanales genera
Taxa named by Martin Cheek